Joshua Jay (born October 30, 1981) is a magician, author, and lecturer. He has performed in over 100 countries, and he was awarded the top prize at the World Magic Seminar in 1998. He fooled Penn and Teller on their hit show, Fool Us, and he holds a Guinness World Record for card tricks. Jay has done magic on numerous television shows, most recently Good Morning America and The Today Show. Most recently, in January 2018, Joshua was recognized by the Society of American Magicians with their highest proclamation, for his contribution to the art of magic. Joshua attended Ohio State University and currently resides in New York City.

Early Years
Joshua attended Canton Country Day School and then GlenOak High School, in Canton, Ohio. He was raised Jewish. He became interested in magic when his father showed him a card trick but did not explain how it was done.

Career
Joshua has designed illusions for stage and screen, including a recent collaboration with HBO for Game of Thrones. Joshua consulted with the United States Postal Service on the design of their postage stamp series, Magic.

On January 30, 2016, at the Columbus Magi-Fest, Joshua set the Guinness World Record for Most Selected Cards Found from a Shuffled Deck in One Minute. He found 21 cards, a record that still stands.

Joshua has done innovative research into what he has classified as "Tragic Magic," tricks that have proved fatal to magicians, assistants, and even spectators. Joshua has delivered keynote addresses on the history of magic at museums across the country, and written an academic article on the subject for Gibiciere.

Joshua appeared at the 2008 Inaugural Ball for President Barack Obama, and has also delivered private performances for former President Clinton.

In 2008, Joshua and friend Andi Gladwin founded Vanishing Inc. Magic, a retail magic outlet that manufactures and distributes props to magicians. Vanishing Inc. is currently one of the largest magic shops in the world, with warehouse and shipping operations in the US and Europe.

Author
Joshua majored in Creative Non-Fiction at the Ohio State University with the intention of writing for and about the magic community. His senior thesis would eventually become The Amazing Book of Cards. He has authored three books for the public: MAGIC: The Complete Course, The Amazing Book of Cards, and, for children, Big Magic for Little Hands. His latest book, How Magicians Think: Misdirection, Deception, and Why Magic Matters will be published on September 28, 2021.

Joshua has also authored a dozen books for magicians and served for 12 years as the Tricks Editor at MAGIC Magazine.

TV Appearances
Joshua Jay has become one of the most prolific writers of the contracting literary scene in magic. Nearly all his books have been translated into other languages, and two titles have been published for the public: Magic: The Complete Course and The Amazing Book of Cards (Workman Publishing). He is also the publisher of many titles, through his company Vanishing Inc Magic with magician Andi Gladwin.

 Discovery Channel's Grand Illusions: The Story of Magic
 Fox Network's Lance Burton's Young Magician's Showcase
 NHK's Magic of America (Japanese National Television)
 NBC's TODAY SHOW (two appearances)
 ABC's Good Morning America
 The Daily Buzz (broadcast on the Spike Network)
 Brad Meltzer's Decoded (Broadcast on the History Channel)
 The CW's Penn & Teller: Fool Us (Episode: Teller Plays with a Full Deck)

As an author
Joshua Jay has become one of the most prolific writers of the contracting literary scene in magic. Nearly all his books have been translated into other languages, and two titles have been published for the public: Magic: The Complete Course and The Amazing Book of Cards (Workman Publishing). He is also the publisher of many titles, through his company Vanishing Inc Magic with magician Andi Gladwin.

 "Overlap" (2005)
 "A Teens Routines" (1998)
 "Joshua Jay's Magic Atlas" (1999)
 "Destroyers: The Magic of Troy Hooser" (2001)
 "Session: The Magic of Joel Givens" (2004)
 "Magic: The Complete Course (Book & DVD)" (2008)
 "Joshua Jay's Amazing Book Of Cards (Book & DVD)" (2010) (translated into German, Japanese, and French)
 "Moments: More Magic of Troy Hooser" (2010)
 Jay was a featured contributor in The Linking Ring magazine in May 2010 (he also appeared on that issue's cover)

Awards
First place awards include:

 2011 Merlin Literary Achievement Award
 World Magic Seminar, 1998 First Place Champion (Presented by Lance Burton)
 International Battle of Magicians (twice, 1996 and 1998)
 Columbus Magi Fest
 Kleinman Incentive Award, Most Promising Youth (SAM National Convention)
 Best Published Trick, Award for Creativity (The Linking Ring magazine)
 Youngest magician to write One-Man-Parade (twenty page exposition of original effects) in The Linking Ring magazine
 Society of American Magicians Close-Up Magician of the Year Award 2011

References

External links

1981 births
Living people
American magicians